Peter Matthew Bauer is an American multi-instrumentalist, singer and songwriter. He is best known as the bass guitarist and organist of the indie rock band The Walkmen, with whom he recorded seven studio albums. Prior to The Walkmen's formation, Bauer and lead vocalist Hamilton Leithauser were both members of the indie rock band The Recoys.

Following The Walkmen's decision to enter an "extreme hiatus", Bauer recorded and released his debut solo album, Liberation!, in 2014, and embarked upon a tour with The Devourers; a newly assembled backing band featuring Fleet Foxes' Skyler Skjelset on guitar.

Bauer released his second studio album, Mount Qaf, in November 2017. Bauer will release his third studio album, Flowers, on September 23, 2022. The album was recorded and co-produced with Bauer's Walkmen bandmate, Matt Barrick.

Backing band
Bauer's band, The Devourers, consists of:
 Matt Oliver – guitar
 Skyler Skjelset – guitar
 Mickey Walker – bass 
 Jesse McIntosh – drums
 Marisa Brown – vocals, percussion
 Jess Conda – vocals, percussion
 Hillary Ashen – vocals, percussion
 Rachel Hoke – vocals, percussion

Discography
Liberation! (2014)
Mount Qaf (2017)
Flowers (2022)

References

American rock singers
American male singers
American bass guitarists
American rock guitarists
American male bass guitarists
Year of birth missing (living people)
Living people
Mexican Summer artists